The men's 5000 meter at the 2016 KNSB Dutch Single Distance Championships took place in Heerenveen at the Thialf ice skating rink on Sunday 27 December 2015. There were 18 participants.

Statistics

Result

Source:

Draw

References

Single Distance Championships
2016 Single Distance